Carenesycha is a genus of longhorn beetles of the subfamily Lamiinae, containing the following species:

 Carenesycha carenata Martins & Galileo, 1990
 Carenesycha velezi Martins & Galileo, 1995

References

Onciderini